Grace Lucile Benham (June 25, 1876 – November 19, 1968) was an American silent film actress.

Grace Lucile Benham was the daughter of C. A. Benham, a grocer.

She married Ogden Crane in 1907 in Sherman, Texas. Both of them were actors in Helen Grantley's theatrical company at the time.

Filmography
 Lord John in New York (1915) as Grace Callender
 Alien Souls (1916) as Mrs. Conway
 The Flirt (1917) as Laura, Her Sister
 Dangerous to Know (1938) as Guest at Party

References

External links

Actresses from Kansas
American film actresses
American silent film actresses
1876 births
1968 deaths
20th-century American actresses